Susan Oluwabimpe "Goldie" Filani Harvey (23 October 1981 – 14 February 2013) was a Nigerian professional singer and a Big Brother Africa star.

Personal life
Susan Oluwabimpe "Goldie" Filani was married to Andrew Harvey, an engineer based in Malaysia, in 2005, though this fact was not widely known before she died.

Harvey had won several African music awards including a Top Naija Music Award. She appeared on Big Brother Africa in 2012 which was her first TV appearance. She and Kenyan rapper Prezzo, another BBA housemate, appeared to have a close relationship on the show.

Death and memorial
After returning home to Nigeria from the 2013 Grammy Awards in Los Angeles, California, she complained of a headache and was rushed to hospital where she was later pronounced dead. Although there were rumors that she may have used drugs that caused her death, her husband denied that possibility. According to an autopsy conducted by the Department of Pathology and Forensic Medicine of the Lagos State University Teaching Hospital, the Nigerian pop star died of ‘hypertensive heart disease,’ which triggered an “intracerebral hemorrhage." Goldie, 31 years old at the time of her death, was laid to rest at the Vaults and Gardens, Ikoyi, Lagos.

She was buried on the 25th of February, 2013 at the Vaults and Gardens Cemetery, Ikoyi, Lagos.

On 13 April 2013, press releases said that properties of Goldie Harvey have been willed to charity organisations.

Discography
2010 – Gold
2011 – Gold Reloaded

Awards and nominations

References

1981 births
2013 deaths
21st-century Nigerian women singers
Neo soul singers
Nigerian women rappers
Yoruba women musicians
Musicians from Lagos
Alumni of the University of Sunderland
Burials at the Vaults and Gardens, Ikoyi
Women hip hop musicians